Ashok Rajagopalan (also known under the blogging pseudonym Kenny Wordsmith) is an Indian writer and artist for over 500 children's books. Rajagopalan has also worked as a graphic designer, freelance cartoonist, and has contributed to the children's magazines Impulse Hoot and Impulse Toot. He first began illustrating children's stories with a piece in the 1989 magazine Junior Quest. Before working in illustration Rajagopalan received a mechanical engineering diploma and worked as a marketing executive, but found that he disliked the experience. In 2011 he participated in a Kickstarter campaign to fund a comic he was co-creating with the artist Asvin Srivatsangam entitled Neelakshi:The Quest for Amrit.

Neelakshi:The Quest for Amrit will be published Yali Dream Creations by end of 2013.

He will be working on Yali Dream Creations' first novel with a tentative title 'Kandiva'.

Selected bibliography
Authored:

Witchsnare - Penguin India
Iliad Retold - New Horizons
Odyssey Retold - New Horizons

Illustrated & Authored:

Sketch with Ashok Raj - a series of 3 books - Scholastic India
Gajapati Kulapati - Tulika Publishers
Gajapati Kulapati Kalabalooosh! - Tulika Publishers

Illustrated:

Eecha Poocha - Tulika Publishers
Andaman’s Boy - Tulika Publishers
Sunu sunu Snail - Storm in the Garden - Tulika Publishers
Birdywood Buzz - Tulika Publishers
That’s My Daddy - Scholastic India
Jataka Tales - Scholastic India
Marine Life - Scholastic India
The Runaway Peppercorn - – Tulika Publishers
Grandma’s Eyes - Tulika Publishers
Dosa - Tulika Publishers
A Silly Story of Bondapalli - Tulika Publishers
The Shining Stones - Tulika Publishers
Dancing Bees - Tulika Publishers
Thakitta Tharikitta Bouncing Ball - Tulika Publishers
4 books in the Thumb Thumb Series - Tulika Publishers
Black Panther - Tulika Publishers
The Spider’s Web - Tulika Publishers
Gasa Gasa Para Para - Tulika Publishers
India’s Olympic Story - Tulika Publishers
Read Aloud Stories - Tulika Publishers

References

External links
Interview with Saffron Tree
Interview with PlusMinus'n'More

Indian children's writers
Living people
Year of birth missing (living people)
Place of birth missing (living people)